Tarpley is a surname, and may refer to:

A. J. Tarpley, American football player
Brenda Tarpley, American singer
Collin S. Tarpley, American judge
Ed Tarpley, American lawyer and politician
Gordon Tarpley, American musician
Lindsay Tarpley, American soccer player
Roy Tarpley, former NBA Basketball player
Stephen Tarpley, American professional baseball pitcher
Thomas M. Tarpley, American Major General
Webster Tarpley, American historian, economist, journalist, and lecturer

Other uses
Tarpley carbine
Tarpley, Texas, an unincorporated community in Bandera County.